The 2009–10 Eastern Michigan Eagles basketball team represented Eastern Michigan University in the college basketball season of 2009–10.  The team was coached by Charles E. Ramsey and played their homes game in Convocation Center.

Before the season

Recruiting

Roster
Roster current as of September 22, when their summer prospectus was published.

Coaching staff

Schedule

|-
!colspan=9| Regular season

|-
!colspan=9| MAC tournament

|- style="background:#f9f9f9;"
| colspan=9 | *Non-Conference Game.  #Rankings from AP Poll.  All times are in Eastern Time Zone.
|}

Season Highlights

11/14 at Oakland 
 EMU's first-ever victory over Oakland in Rochester, Michigan.

03/11 vs Akron 
 Carlos Medlock scored 42 points, second best all time in the MAC tournament.
 Carlos Medlock's 26 field goals attempted is good enough for second best all time in the MAC tournament behind former EMU player Fred Cofield.
 Carlos Medlock's 14 3-point goals attempted is good enough for second best all time in the MAC tournament.
Carlos Medlock drafted by NBADL in 6th round by the Utah Flash.

Awards

2nd Team All-MAC 
 Carlos Medlock
 Brandon Bowdry

MAC Honorable Mention 
 Justin Dobbins

MAC All-Tournament Team 
 Carlos Medlock

MAC Individual Records 
 Brandon Bowdry- Rebounding (319/10.0)
 Justin Dobbins- Field Goal Percentage (.615)

References

Eastern Michigan Eagles men's basketball seasons
Eastern Michigan Eagles
Eastern Michigan Eagles men's basketball
Eastern Michigan Eagles men's basketball